John Philip Baca (born January 10, 1949) is a former United States Army soldier and a Vietnam War veteran. He was awarded the Medal of Honor, the highest decoration of the United States Armed Forces, for his actions in Vietnam.

Early life
Baca was born on January 10, 1949, in Providence, Rhode Island, and was raised in San Diego, California. Baca was drafted into the United States Army on June 10, 1968.

Vietnam War
By February 10, 1970, Baca was stationed in South Vietnam as a specialist four with Company D of the 1st Battalion, 12th Cavalry Regiment, 1st Cavalry Division. On that day, in Phước Long Province during Operation Toan Thang IV, he was serving on a recoilless rifle team when the lead platoon of his company was ambushed. Baca led his team forward through intense fire to reach the besieged platoon. When a fragmentation grenade was tossed into their midst, he "unhesitatingly, and with complete disregard for his own safety," covered it with his helmet and then laid his body over the helmet, smothering the blast and saving eight fellow soldiers from severe injury or death.

Baca survived his wounds and was formally awarded the Medal of Honor by President Richard M. Nixon on March 2, 1971. Two other soldiers in Company D, Allen J. Lynch and Rodney J. Evans, had previously earned the medal.

In 1990, Baca returned to Vietnam with seven other soldiers of the Veterans Vietnam Restoration Project. The group spent eight weeks working alongside former North Vietnamese Army soldiers building a health clinic in a village north of Hanoi.

Baca rarely speaks publicly about the events for which he was awarded the Medal of Honor. However, he prefers to recall an event that occurred on Christmas Day, 1969, when he was walking ahead of his unit, acting as "point," and surprised a young North Vietnamese soldier sitting alone on top of an enemy bunker in the jungle. He saw that the soldier could not reach his rifle quickly and, not wanting to shoot him, yelled in Vietnamese for him to surrender. Not only was he able to take his "Christmas gift" alive and unharmed, the young man, twenty years later, was among the Vietnamese that Baca worked with building the clinic in 1990.

Post-war life
Baca remains active in social causes, particularly related to Vietnam veterans issues and the plight of the homeless.

In 2002, a park was named in his honor in Huntington Beach, California. At the park's dedication on April 27, he read the following poem he penned for the occasion:

After living in Huntington Beach, Baca moved to Julian, California, enjoying the relative solitude.

Medal of Honor citation

Decorations
 Combat Infantryman Badge
  Medal of Honor
  Silver Star
  Bronze Star
  Purple Heart
  Air Medal
  Army Good Conduct Medal
  National Defense Service Medal
  Vietnam Service Medal with (at least) one campaign star
  Vietnam Gallantry Cross Unit Citation
  Vietnam Civil Actions Medal Unit Citation
   Vietnam Campaign Medal

See also

List of Medal of Honor recipients for the Vietnam War
List of Hispanic Medal of Honor recipients

References

External links
 John Baca, Medal of Honor recipient

1949 births
Living people
United States Army Medal of Honor recipients
United States Army personnel of the Vietnam War
Recipients of the Silver Star
United States Army soldiers
Recipients of the Air Medal
People from Providence, Rhode Island
Vietnam War recipients of the Medal of Honor
People from Huntington Beach, California
People from Julian, California
Military personnel from Rhode Island